is a Prefectural Natural Park in central Aomori Prefecture, Japan. Established in 1958, the park spans the borders of the municipalities of Kuroishi and Hirakawa.

See also
 National Parks of Japan

References

Parks and gardens in Aomori Prefecture
Kuroishi, Aomori
Hirakawa, Aomori
Protected areas established in 1958
1958 establishments in Japan